Raghunath Singh Verma (7 September 1948 – 20 December 2009), was an influential Indian politician involved mainly in the state affairs of Uttar Pradesh, Rajasthan, Uttarakhand, Bihar and Madhya Pradesh. Born in Jasrana Town near Shikohabad), Mainpuri, Uttar Pradesh, he died in Jasrana in 2009.

Political career
He was a member of the Vidhan Sabha of Uttar Pradesh from 1967–68 and 1969-74 and was a member of the sixth and seventh Lok Sabha for Uttar Pradesh. He left politics in 1990 and worked in social services.

Personal life
A farmer by birth, Singh Verma wore the simple cotton khādī in support of Mahatma Gandhi and he was a pure vegetarian. After completing his law degree he began work as a lawyer and at the same time became involved in politics because of his patriotism.

Caste affiliation
Raghunath Singh Verma was a dominant member of the Lodhi community.

References

India MPs 1977–1979
1948 births
2009 deaths
India MPs 1980–1984
Lok Sabha members from Uttar Pradesh
People from Mainpuri district
Uttar Pradesh MLAs 1967–1969
Uttar Pradesh MLAs 1969–1974